Mendora may refer to:

 Mendora, Bhopal, a village in India
 Mendora, Nizamabad district, India
 Mendora, Ontario, a community in Canada

See also
 Mendorra, a fictional country in the American soap opera One Life to Live